Booky and the Secret Santa is a 2007 Canadian family television film directed by Peter Moss from a book adapted by Joe Wiesenfeld and written by Bernice Thurman Hunter. It stars Rachel Marcus and Megan Follows. The film first aired on December 11, 2007 on CBC Television. A prequel set five years before 2006's Booky Makes Her Mark, all the juvenile roles were recast.

Premise 
Booky (Rachel Marcus) tries to bring her family the best Christmas possible, despite hard times during the Great Depression of the 1930s when her dad (Stuart Hughes) loses his job. She gets help from her mum (Megan Follows) and a department store owner (Kenneth Welsh).

Cast

Recognition

Awards and nominations
 2008, Directors Guild of Canada nomination for 'DGC Team Award'
 2008, Gemini Awards nomination for 'Best Sound in a Dramatic Program'
 2008, Gemini Awards nomination for Nahanni Johnstone for 'Best Performance by an Actress in a Featured Supporting Role in a Dramatic Program or Mini-Series'
 2008, Gemini Awards nomination for Megan Follows for 'Best Performance by an Actress in a Leading Role in a Dramatic Program or Mini-Series'
 2008, Gemini Awards nomination for Rachel Marcus for 'Best Performance by an Actress in a Leading Role in a Dramatic Program or Mini-Series'

See also
 List of Christmas films

References

External links 
 
 

CBC Television original films
Christmas television films
English-language Canadian films
Films based on Canadian novels
Films set in the 1930s
Films set in Toronto
2007 television films
2007 films
Christmas novels
Canadian drama television films
2000s Canadian films